Unsung may refer to:

Unsung or Un-Sung, an alternate spelling of the Korean given name Eun-sung
"Unsung" (song), a song by alternative metal band Helmet
Unsung (EP), an EP by Christian metalcore band The Chariot
Unsung: A History of Women in American Music, a book by Christina Ammer 
Unsung (TV series), a music documentary television series
Unsung Hollywood, a spinoff of the Unsung music documentary TV series
 "Unsung", by Juliana Hatfield from Peace & Love
 "Unsung", a song from the Pink Floyd album The Endless River
 "Unsung", a song from the Vanessa Carlton album Be Not Nobody

See also 

 Sung (disambiguation)
 Unsong (disambiguation)
 Unsung Heroes (disambiguation)